The Eureka Schoolhouse is a historic school building at 470 Charlestown Road (Vermont Route 11) in the Goulds Mill village of Springfield, Vermont.  Built in 1785, it is the oldest surviving schoolhouse in the state.  It is the centerpiece of a small historic site operated by the state. The school was listed on the National Register of Historic Places in 1971.

Description and history
The Eureka Schoolhouse stands between Vermont Route 11 (to the south) and the Black River to the north, in the dispersed rural setting of Goulds Mill, southeast of the Springfield's main village center.  It is a small single-story structure, built out of hand-hewn timbers and covered by a wooden shingle roof.  Its walls are finished in rough-cut wooden boards, scored to resemble cut stone.  A brick chimney rises from the rear right corner.  The front facade, facing south toward the road, is three bays wide, with the entrance in the left bay, and large sash windows in the other two.

The school is believed to have been built in 1785, and is the oldest known schoolhouse in the state.  It underwent a series of alterations over the 19th century, and was closed in 1900.  It stood vacant and abandoned for many years, and was carefully disassembled by preservationists and stored in 1958.  In 1968, it was reassembled to its original configuration (as best it could be determined from extant records) at the present site, which also includes the relocated Baltimore Covered Bridge.

See also
National Register of Historic Places listings in Windsor County, Vermont
List of Vermont State Historic Sites

References

External links
Eureka Schoolhouse - official site

Defunct schools in Vermont
School buildings on the National Register of Historic Places in Vermont
School buildings completed in 1785
Education museums in the United States
History museums in Vermont
Museums in Windsor County, Vermont
National Register of Historic Places in Windsor County, Vermont
Vermont State Historic Sites
1785 establishments in Vermont
Buildings and structures in Springfield, Vermont